C27 is a secondary route in Namibia that runs from Sesriem, in the Namib, to the C13 junction near Helmeringhausen.

References 

Roads in Namibia